Berni Stapleton is a Canadian writer residing in Newfoundland. Along with writing, Stapleton is also a performer and playwright. Her debut book, They Let Down Baskets, won the 1999 Newfoundland Book Award for Best Non-Fiction.

Life 
Stapleton was born in North West River and raised in Marystown. She was a playwright-in-residence with the Playwright's Workshop Montreal, Stratford Shakespeare Festival, PARC, as well as other national companies. She was also the Artistic Director of the Grand Bank Regional Theatre for eleven years. She has a production company called In Conjunction. In 2019, Stapleton was named Memorial University's writer-in-residence. She has also received a grant from the Canada Council for the Arts to write Girly Muckle and the Queer Hands.

Works

Books 

 They Let Down Baskets (1998)
 This is the Cat (2015)
 Rants, Riffs, and Roars (2009)
 Girly Muckle and the Queer Hands (to be released)

Plays and Musicals 

 No Change in the Weather
 The Pope and Princess Di
 Woman in a Monkey Cage
 Offensive to Some
 Our Frances
 Dolly
 Late Lesbians and Other Bloomers
 Mill Girls

Awards 

 1999 Newfoundland Book Award for They Let Down the Baskets
 2018 Arts and Letters Award for Best Dramatic Script for Dolly
 Rhonda Payne Award from Arts NL
 Ambassador of Tourism Award from Hospitality NL

References 

20th-century Canadian women writers
21st-century Canadian women writers
Writers from Newfoundland and Labrador
Living people
Year of birth missing (living people)